C.L.I.F. 5 (Chinese: 警徽天职之海岸卫队 is a Singapore police procedural series produced and telecast on Mediacorp Channel 8 in collaboration with the Singapore Police Force. This is the fifth installment to C.L.I.F. in 2011, and this 20-episode series was first telecast from 23 September to 18 October 2019 on free-to-air TV in Singapore. The series centers on events happening in the Police Coast Guard and stars Rebecca Lim, Pierre Png, Shane Pow, Nick Teo & He Ying Ying as the main casts of the reboot installment. This series is co-sponsored by Sheng Siong Supermarkets and Daikin and the Singapore Police Force.

Synopsis (English)
Wang Man Ting is an officer with the Police Coast Guard (PCG). Le Xiao Tian, CEO of an electronic company is arranging an illegal immigration. In order to create confusion for the police, he orders Guo Tai, the boss of a fish farm to kill his enemy Lucas. In order to find the killer, Man Ting arrives at Guo Tai's fish farm and takes him hostage...

Casts

Main cast

Other cast

Singapore Police Force (SPF)

Police Coast Guards

Criminal Investigation Department

Criminals

Xiao's family

Wang's family

Li's family

 Cynthia Koh as Li XiaoyingKoh plays a fish seller and older sister to Li Xiaorong.
 Shane Pow as Li Xiaorong

Le's family

Lu's family

Others

Accolades

Star Awards 2021
C.L.I.F. 5 is nominated for 4 awards. It only managed to win one and only Young Talent Award.

References

2019 Singaporean television series debuts
2019 Singaporean television series endings
2010s Singaporean television series
2010s police procedural television series
Channel 8 (Singapore) original programming
Police Coast Guard (Singapore)
C.L.I.F.